Discovery Primea is a 68-storey mixed-use residential tower and one of the tallest buildings in the Philippines located in Makati along Ayala Avenue. It stands on the former Gilarmi Apartments, one of the earliest urban residential condominiums built in the Makati Central Business District. JTKC, Inc. is the developer of the residential condominium and one of earliest developer of residential condominium units in the Philippines. The latter also owns the Discovery Suites, a service-apartment in the Ortigas Center business district in Mandaluyong. The residential tower was opened in 2015.

History
The Discovery Primea was built on the land where the Gilarmi Apartments used to stand. The Gilarmi Apartments was the first serviced apartment building to be built in the Makati Central Business District.

In 2013, construction of the top floor was topped out signaling the completion of the construction of Discovery Primea Tower, effectively making it one of the tallest buildings of the Philippines.

See also 
 List of tallest buildings in the Philippines

References

Skyscrapers in Makati
Residential skyscrapers in Metro Manila
Residential buildings completed in 2013